Robert Norman Ross (October 29, 1942 – July 4, 1995) was an American painter, art instructor, and television host. He was the creator and host of The Joy of Painting, an instructional television program that aired from 1983 to 1994 on PBS in the United States, CBC in Canada, and similar channels in Latin America, Europe and elsewhere. Ross would subsequently become widely known through his posthumous internet presence.

Early life

Ross was born in Daytona Beach, Florida, to Jack and Ollie Ross, a carpenter and a waitress respectively, and raised in Orlando, Florida. As an adolescent, Ross cared for injured animals, including armadillos, snakes, alligators and squirrels, one of which was later featured in several episodes of his television show. He had a half-brother Jim, whom he mentioned in passing on his show. Ross dropped out of high school in the 9th grade. While working as a carpenter with his father, he lost part of his left index finger, which did not affect his ability to later hold a palette while painting.

Military career

In 1961, 18-year-old Ross enlisted in the United States Air Force and was put into service as a medical records technician. He rose to the rank of master sergeant and served as the first sergeant of the clinic at Eielson Air Force Base in Alaska, where he first saw the snow and mountains that later appear as recurring themes in his paintings. He developed his quick painting technique during brief daily work breaks. Having held military positions that required him to act tough and mean, "the guy who makes you scrub the latrine, the guy who makes you make your bed, the guy who screams at you for being late to work", Ross decided he would not raise his voice when he left the military.

Career as a painter

During his 20-year Air Force career, Ross developed an interest in painting after attending an art class at the Anchorage U.S.O. club. He found himself frequently at odds with many of his painting instructors, who were more interested in abstract painting. Ross said, "They'd tell you what makes a tree, but they wouldn't tell you how to paint a tree."

Ross was working as a part-time bartender when he discovered a TV show called The Magic of Oil Painting, hosted by German painter Bill Alexander. Alexander used a 16th-century painting style called  (Italian for 'first attempt'), widely known as "wet-on-wet", that allowed him to create a painting within thirty minutes. Ross studied and mastered the technique, began painting and then successfully selling Alaskan landscapes that he would paint on novelty gold-mining pans. Eventually, Ross's income from sales surpassed his military salary. He retired from the Air Force in 1981 as a master sergeant.

He returned to Florida, studied painting with Alexander, joined his "Alexander Magic Art Supplies Company" and became a traveling salesman and tutor. Annette Kowalski, who had attended one of his sessions in Clearwater, Florida, convinced Ross he could succeed on his own. Ross, his wife, and Kowalski pooled their savings to create his company, which struggled at first.

Ross was noted for his permed hair, which he ultimately disliked but kept after he had integrated it into the company logo.

The origins of the TV show The Joy of Painting are unclear. It was filmed at the studio of the PBS station WIPB in Muncie, Indiana.

The show ran from January 11, 1983, to May 17, 1994, but reruns  continue to appear in many broadcast areas and countries, including the non-commercial digital subchannel network Create. In the United Kingdom, the BBC re-ran episodes during the COVID-19 pandemic while most viewers were in lockdown at home.

During each half-hour segment, Ross would instruct viewers in the quick, wet-on-wet oil painting technique, painting a scene without sketching it first, but creating the image directly from his imagination, in real time. He explained his limited paint palette, deconstructing the process into simple steps.

Art critic Mira Schor compared Ross to Fred Rogers, host of Mister Rogers' Neighborhood, noting that Ross's soft voice and the slow pace of his speech were similar.

With help from Annette and Walt Kowalski, Ross used his television show to promote a line of art supplies and class recordings, building what would become a $15-million businessBob Ross Inc.which would ultimately expand to include classes taught by other artists trained in his methods. Following Ross's death, ownership of the company was passed to the Kowalskis.

Ross also filmed wildlife, squirrels in particular, usually in his garden, and he would often take in injured or abandoned squirrels and other animals. Small animals often appeared on his Joy of Painting canvases.

Ross painted an estimated 30,000 paintings during his lifetime. Despite the unusually high supply of original paintings, Bob Ross original paintings are scarce on the art market, with sale prices of the paintings averaging in the thousands of dollars and frequently topping $10,000. The major auction houses have never sold any of Ross's paintings, and Bob Ross Inc. continues to own many of the ones he painted for The Joy of Painting, as Ross himself was opposed to having his work turned into financial instruments.

In contrast to more traditionally famous artists, Ross's work, described by an art appraisal service as a cross between "fine art" and "entertainment memorabilia" — is most highly sought after by common fans of The Joy of Painting, as opposed to wealthy collectors. The artwork circulating among collectors is largely from Ross's work from before he launched the television show.

Technique

Ross used a wet-on-wet oil painting technique of painting over a thin base layer of wet paint. The painting could progress without first drying. The technique used a limited selection of tools and colors that didn't require a large investment in expensive equipment. Ross frequently recommended odorless paint thinner (odorless mineral spirits) for brush cleaning.

Combining the wet-painting method with the use of large one- and two-inch brushes, as well as painting knives, allowed the painter to quickly complete a landscape scene.

Ross painted three versions of almost every painting featured on his show. The first was painted prior to taping and sat on an easel off-camera during filming, where Ross used it as a reference to create the second copy which viewers actually watched him paint. After filming the episode, he painted a more detailed version for inclusion in his instructional books. The versions were each marked on the side or back of the canvas: "Kowalski" for the initial version, "tv" for the version painted during the TV show and "book" for the book version.

Influences

Ross dedicated the first episode of the second season of The Joy of Painting to Bill Alexander, explaining that "years ago, Bill taught me this fantastic [wet-on-wet] technique, and I feel as though he gave me a precious gift, and I'd like to share that gift with you." As Ross's popularity grew, his relationship with Alexander became increasingly strained. "He betrayed me," Alexander told The New York Times in 1991. "I invented 'wet on wet', I trained him, and... he thinks he can do it better."

Art historians have pointed out that the "wet-on-wet" (or alla prima) technique actually originated in Flanders during the 15th century and was used by Frans Hals, Diego Velázquez, Caravaggio, Paul Cézanne, John Singer Sargent and Claude Monet, among many others.

Style

Ross was well known for phrases he tended to repeat while painting, such as "let's add some happy little trees".

In most episodes, Ross would note that he enjoyed cleaning his paint brush. He was fond of drying off a brush dipped in odorless thinner by striking it against the can of thinner, then striking it against a box (on early seasons of the show) and a trash can (on later seasons). Occasionally, he would strike the brush hard on the trash can, saying he "hit the bucket" and then on the easel. He would smile and often laugh aloud as he said to "beat the Devil out of it". He also used a lightly sanded palette to avoid reflections from the studio lighting.

In every show, Ross wore jeans and a plain light-colored shirt, which he believed would be a timeless look, and spoke as if addressing one viewer.

When asked about his relaxed and calm approach, he said, "I got a letter from somebody here a while back, and they said, 'Bob, everything in your world seems to be happy.' That's for sure. That's why I paint. It's because I can create the kind of world that I want, and I can make this world as happy as I want it. Shoot, if you want bad stuff, watch the news."

The landscapes he painted, typically mountains, lakes, snow and log cabin scenes, were inspired by his years in Alaska, where he was stationed for the majority of his Air Force career. He repeatedly said everyone has inherent artistic talent and could become an accomplished artist given time, practice and encouragement. Ross would say, "we don't make mistakes; we just have happy accidents."

In 2014, the blog FiveThirtyEight analysed 381 episodes in which Ross painted live, concluding that 91% of Ross's paintings contained at least one tree, 44% included clouds, 39% included mountains and 34% included mountain lakes. By his own estimation, Ross completed more than thirty thousand paintings. His work rarely contained human subjects or signs of human life. On rare occasions, he would incorporate a cabin, sometimes with a chimney but without smoke, and possibly unoccupied.

Other media appearances

Ross was fond of country music and in 1987 was invited on stage by Hank Snow at the Grand Ole Opry in Nashville, Tennessee. The audience gave him a huge ovation; he was slightly nervous at first, but felt better after cracking a joke to the crowd. Snow was later given a private painting lesson by Ross.

Ross visited New York City to promote his hardcover book, The Best of the Joy of Painting with Bob Ross, and painting techniques to a studio audience several times. On one visit in 1989, he appeared on The Joan Rivers Show. He returned in 1992 for a live show with hosts Regis Philbin and Kathie Lee Gifford. In 1994, Ross appeared on the Phil Donahue Show and took five audience members on-stage to do a painting. Donahue also did a painting during that episode.

In the early 1990s, Ross did several MTV promotional spots that, according to the American City Business Journals, "dovetailed perfectly with Generation X's burgeoning obsession with all things ironic and retro".

In 1995, a visibly ill Ross made his final public television appearance as a guest on the pilot episode of the children's series The Adventures of Elmer and Friends. The series premiered in 1996, one year after Ross's death. The episode included a final message of thanks from Ross to his fans and viewers and a musical tribute.

Personal life

Ross was married three times and had two children: a child he fathered from a relationship he had as a teenager, and a son, Robert Stephen "Steve" Ross, with his first wife, Vivian Ridge. Steve, also a talented painter, occasionally appeared on The Joy of Painting and became a Ross-certified instructor. Steve appeared on camera in the last episode of Season 1, in which he read a series of general "how-to" questions sent in by viewers during the season. Bob answered them one at a time, technique by technique, until he had completed an entire painting.

Ross and Ridge's marriage ended in divorce in 1977, allegedly due to Ross' infidelity. Ross and his second wife Jane had no children together. In 1992, Jane died of cancer. In 1995, two months before his death, Ross married for a third time, to Lynda Brown.

Ross was very secretive about his life and had a great preference for privacy. Some of only a few interviews with his close-knit circle of friends and family can be found in the 2011 PBS documentary Bob Ross: The Happy Painter. Other conversations were destroyed as part of a legal settlement between Ross' family and Bob Ross Inc. Bob Ross Inc. is protective of his intellectual property and his privacy to this day.

Ross was not a member of any specific organized religion. He frequently expressed his belief in a creator god and often closed his shows with a wish that "God bless" his viewers.

Death and aftermath

A cigarette smoker for most of his adult life, Ross expected to die young and had several health problems over the course of his life. He died at the age of 52 on July 4, 1995, in Orlando, Florida, due to complications from lymphoma.

His remains are interred at Woodlawn Memorial Park in Gotha, Florida, under a plaque marked "Bob Ross; Television Artist". Ross kept his diagnosis a secret from the general public. His lymphoma was not known outside of his circle of family and friends until after his death.

Under the terms of the incorporation of Bob Ross Inc.,  the death of any partner in the company would lead to that person's stock being equally divided among the partners. Ross's death, along with that of his second wife, the other partner in the company, left the Kowalskis with sole ownership of the company. The Kowalskis were largely only interested in using Ross's name for painting supplies. They became very aggressive against Ross's family members and associates, allegedly trying to pressure an ailing Ross to sign over rights to his estate before his death.

Instead, Ross wrote the Kowalskis out of his will and testament, leaving his estate and rights to his name and likeness to his son Steve and half-brother Jimmie Cox. The Kowalskis countered that virtually everything Ross had done in his lifetime was a work for hire and thus Ross had no right to bequeath them. The Kowalskis eventually won the lawsuit.

After the Kowalskis retired and Joan Kowalski took over the company, she became more open to merchandising the Ross brand outside of its core business of painting products, setting in motion the mass marketing of his name from the 2010s onward. Joan also engineered a settlement with Steve Ross and Jimmie Cox granting Bob Ross Inc. rights to Ross's name and likeness, in exchange for a guarantee that Steve Ross could resume his art career without threat of lawsuit, something that Steve Ross said had largely stopped him from painting in public after his father's death.

Legacy

Ross's likeness has become part of popular culture, with his image spoofed in television programs, films and video games like Family Guy, The Boondocks, Deadpool 2 and Smite.

Google celebrated the 70th anniversary of his birth with a Google Doodle on October 29, 2012. It portrayed Ross painting a depiction of the letter "g" with a landscape in the background. A board game titled Bob Ross: The Art of Chill was released and carried by Target stores, while a Chia Pet model in Bob Ross's likeness was also released. Ross was going to have a video game released on Wii, the Nintendo DS and PC, with development handled by AGFRAG Entertainment Group, although this never came to fruition.

Newfound interest in Ross occurred in 2015 as part of the launch of Twitch Creative. Twitch hosted a nine-day marathon of The Joy of Painting beginning on October 29 to commemorate what would have been Ross's 73rd birthday. Twitch reported that 5.6million viewers watched the marathon and, due to its popularity, created a weekly rebroadcast of one season of The Joy of Painting each Monday. A portion of the advertising revenue was promised to charities, including St. Jude Children's Research Hospital.

In June 2016, Ross's series Beauty Is Everywhere was added to the Netflix lineup. The 30-minute episodes are taken from seasons 20, 21 and 22 of the original The Joy of Painting series. The newfound interest surprised the Kowalskis, since they were managing Ross's image and The Joy of Painting episodes. They created a YouTube channel for Ross which gained more than a million subscribers within a year.

The renewed interest in Ross also led to questions of where his paintings were located, given that more than a thousand works were created for The Joy of Painting. In an investigative report by The New York Times, the Kowalskis affirmed that they still held all of them, though without the proper care generally needed to store art. Prompted by numerous letters and emails from fans of Ross, the Smithsonian American Art Museum contacted the Kowalskis and offered to take a selection of Ross's paintings, along with other items from the show, to place on exhibit at the museum.

In 2020, the makers of Magic: The Gathering announced a limited release of Bob Ross paintings adapted to card artwork.

In August 2021, Netflix released a documentary called Bob Ross: Happy Accidents, Betrayal & Greed exploring Ross's life, career, legacy, and the controversy surrounding the Kowalskis versus Bob Ross's family.

In 2021, Bob Ross Inc. in conjunction with Running Press Kids, in imprint of Hachette Book Group, released the official Bob Ross children's book biography titled: This is Your World: The Story of Bob Ross. Written by Sophia Gholz and illustrated by Robin Boyden, the book shares the story of Ross's life and how he eventually became one of the most well-known American painters of his time.

ASMR

The Twitch streams created a new interest in Ross and caused his popularity to grow. His videos subsequently became popular with devotees of ASMR (autonomous sensory meridian response). ASMR refers to a pleasant form of paresthesia, or tingling, often brought about by specific visual or auditory stimuli. Many viewers found that listening to Ross triggered an ASMR response. According to Joan Kowalski, the president of Bob Ross Inc.: "He's sort of the godfather of ASMR... People were into him for ASMR reasons before there even was an ASMR."

See also
 Tony Hart, an English artist best known for his work on children's television

References

Further reading

External links

 
 
 
 
 Bob Ross Experience, museum in Ross' old studio
 Where are all the Bob Ross paintings?, video documentary by The New York Times (2019)

1942 births
1995 deaths
20th-century American educators
20th-century American male artists
20th-century American military personnel
20th-century American painters
American art educators
American landscape painters
American male painters
American television hosts
Burials in Florida
Deaths from cancer in Florida
Deaths from lymphoma
Educators from Alaska
Educators from Florida
Internet memes
Military personnel from Alaska
Military personnel from Florida
Painters from Alaska
Painters from Florida
PBS people
People from Daytona Beach, Florida
People from North Pole, Alaska
People from Orlando, Florida
Television personalities from Florida
Television show creators
United States Air Force airmen